The Women is a 2017 Nigerian drama thriller film directed and produced by Blessing Effiom Egbe. The film stars Omoni Oboli, Katherine Obiang, Ufuoma McDermott, and Kate Henshaw-Nuttal with Gregory Ojefua, Lilian Afegbai, Roxy Antak and Femi Branch in supporting roles. The film is about four female middle aged friends. They bare many secrets about each other and respective marriages. One day they congregate in a resort one weekend on the occasion of one of their birthdays and expressed their secretive lives.

The film premiered on 29 September 2017. The film received positive reviews from critics and screened worldwide.

Cast
 Omoni Oboli as Teni Michaels
 Katherine Obiang as Rose Oyedeji
 Ufuoma McDermott as Omoh Oghene
 Kate Henshaw-Nuttal as Ene Enweuzo
 Gregory Ojefua as Chubi Enweuzo
 Lilian Afegbai as Esi
 Roxy Antak as John
 Femi Branch as Ayo Oyedeji
 Kalu Ikeagwu as Bels Michaels
 Anthony Monjaro as Maro Oghene
 Rita Dominic		
 Peters Ijagbemi as Account Officer
 Unity Nathan as Gift
 Deji Omogbehin as Doctor
 Tobias Pious as Bellman
 Nene Peters Thomas as Manager
 Tomi Adeoye as Attendant
 Glory Ugbodaga as Sales Girl
 Tony Undie as Bellman

References

External links 
 

English-language Nigerian films
2017 films
2017 thriller films
2010s English-language films